"Come and Talk to Me" is a song by American R&B group Jodeci from their debut album Forever My Lady (1991). The song was the fourth single released in promotion for the album in March 1992.  As the third number one R&B hit for Jodeci, "Come and Talk to Me" spent number 1 on the R&B chart for two weeks and peaked at 11 on the Hot 100.  The song also topped the R&B year-end chart for 1992.

The song was written, produced and arranged by Al B Sure and fellow Jodeci member DeVante Swing. The song features K-Ci as the lead singer, and JoJo, Mr. Dalvin and DeVante Swing on the chorus. The music video was first seen in the spring of 1992. There are 3 different edited versions of the music video. A 4th brand new music video was shot & released for the "Hip Hop Remix" (or Radio Remix) which was produced by Sean "Puffy" Combs. The "Hip Hop Remix" features a rap verse from Fat Doug, but he doesn't appear in the music video.

Track listings

US Promo
 Come & Talk To Me (LP Edit) 4:02
 Come & Talk To Me (Radio Remix) 6:20
 Come & Talk To Me (Instrumental) 6:25
 Come & Talk To Me (Hip Hop Remix) 6:20
 Come & Talk To Me (Horny Mix) 5:30
 Come & Talk To Me (Dance Mix) 5:30

US Maxi-CD
 Come & Talk To Me (Album Edit) 4:02
 Come & Talk To Me (Radio Remix) 6:20
 Come & Talk To Me (Hip Hop Remix) 6:20
 Come & Talk To Me (Horny Mix) 5:30
 Gotta Love (New R&B Edit) 4:19

Chart performance

Personnel
Written and produced by DeVante Swing

Cedric "K-Ci" Hailey - Lead and Background vocals
Joel "JoJo" Hailey - Background vocals
DeVante Swing - Background vocals
Mr. Dalvin - Background vocals

Year-end charts

Certifications

See also
List of number-one R&B singles of 1992 (U.S.)

Notes

1992 singles
Jodeci songs
Songs written by DeVante Swing
Song recordings produced by DeVante Swing
Songs written by Al B. Sure!
1991 songs
Uptown Records singles
MCA Records singles